Giuseppe Cozzolino (born 12 July 1985) is an Italian footballer who plays for AQS Borgo Veneto.

Biography
He was signed by Lecce in co-ownership deal in January 2005 from Serie C1 team Giulianova Calcio, although did not play any Serie A match, he earn a place in Italian U-20 on 2005 FIFA World Youth Championship.  He then made 25 appearances, scored 2 goals. He follow Lecce relegated to Serie B in June 2006.

In January 2007, he was signed by Chievo in another co-ownership deal for €300,000.
On 11 February 2007 he played his first Serie A match for Chievo against Inter.

In summer 2007, Chievo own half was transferred to Cremonese of Serie C1. Lecce paid Chievo €260,000 and Cremonese paid Lecce for an undisclosed fee.

In mid-2009, he was signed by Calcio Como.

In July 2011 he terminated his contract with club.

Ahead of the 2019/20 season, Cozzolino joined ASD Castelbaldo Masi. He left the club in December 2019 and joined Prima Categoria club AQS Borgo Veneto.

References

External links 
 uslecce.it 
 FIGC  
 
 

1985 births
Living people
Italian footballers
Italy youth international footballers
Giulianova Calcio players
U.S. Lecce players
A.C. ChievoVerona players
U.S. Cremonese players
Como 1907 players
S.S.D. Axys Zola players
S.P.A.L. players
Serie A players
Serie B players
Serie C players
Association football forwards
Sportspeople from the Province of Naples
Footballers from Campania
People from San Gennaro Vesuviano